An aircraft type designator is a two-, three- or four-character alphanumeric code designating every aircraft type (and some sub-types) that may appear in flight planning. These codes are defined by both the International Civil Aviation Organization (ICAO) and the International Air Transport Association (IATA). ICAO codes are published in ICAO Document 8643 Aircraft Type Designators and are used by air traffic control and airline operations such as flight planning. While ICAO designators are used to distinguish between aircraft types and variants that have different performance characteristics affecting ATC, the codes do not differentiate between service characteristics (passenger and freight variants of the same type/series will have the same ICAO code). IATA codes are published in Appendix A of IATA's annual Standard Schedules Information Manual (SSIM) and are used for airline timetables and computer reservation systems. IATA designators are used to distinguish between aircraft types and variants that have differences from an airline commercial perspective (size, role, interior configuration, etc). As well as an Aircraft Type Code, IATA may optionally define an Aircraft Group Code for types and variants that share common characteristics (for example all Boeing 747 freighters, regardless of series).

The following is a partial list of ICAO type designators for a range of multi-engined and turbine aircraft, with corresponding IATA type codes where available.

See also
 List of aircraft
 List of Bushplanes
 List of light transport aircraft
 List of racing aircraft
 List of regional airliners

References

International Civil Aviation Organization
aircraft type designators